Bougainville Island (Tok Pisin: Bogenvil) is the main island of the Autonomous Region of Bougainville, which is part of Papua New Guinea. It was previously the main landmass in the German Empire-associated North Solomons. The population of the whole province, including nearby islets such as the Carterets, is approximately 300,000 (2019 census). Even though the strait is narrow, there is no bridge across it, but there is a regular ferry service between the key settlements on either side. The main airport (or airstrip) in the north is in the town of Buka. 

Bougainville is the largest island in the Solomon Islands archipelago. Most of the islands in this archipelago (which are primarily concentrated in the southern and eastern portions of it) are part of the politically independent Solomon Islands.

Among the large islands of Papua New Guinea, New Ireland is the closest to Buka.

The citizens of Bougainville voted in a referendum to become independent from Papua New Guinea by 2027, but the central government has said they have the final say.

History

During the Last Ice Age, present-day Bougainville Island was part of a single landmass known as "Greater Bougainville", which spanned from the northern tip of Buka Island to the Nggela Islands. The earliest evidence of human settlement is at  Kilu Cave on Buka Island, where the earliest remains are from 26700–18100 BC. The first settlers were Melanesian people, likely related to modern Papuans and Indigenous Australians. In the 2nd millennium BC, Austronesian people arrived, bringing with them domesticated pigs, chickens, dogs, and obsidian tools. The first European contact with Bougainville was in 1768, when the French explorer Louis Antoine de Bougainville arrived and named the main island after himself.

British and American whaling ships visited the island for provisions, water and wood in the 19th century. The first on record was the Roscoe in 1822, and the last was Palmetto in 1881.

The German Empire laid claim to Bougainville in 1899, annexing it into German New Guinea. Christian missionaries arrived on the island in 1902.

During World War I, Australia occupied German New Guinea, including Bougainville. It became part of the Australian Territory of New Guinea under a League of Nations mandate in 1920.

In 1942, during World War II, Japan invaded the island, but allied forces launched the Bougainville campaign to regain control of the island in 1943. Despite heavy bombardments, the Japanese garrisons remained on the island until 1945. Following the war, the Territory of New Guinea, including Bougainville, returned to Australian control.

It was on Bougainville Island, on April 18, 1943, during the Pacific War, that the Japanese admiral Isoroku Yamamoto, who was the commander-in-chief of Japan’s Combined Fleet, died after his plane was attacked by US fighter planes and crashed into the jungle.

In 1949 the Territory of New Guinea, including Bougainville, merged with the Australian Territory of Papua, forming the Territory of Papua and New Guinea, a United Nations Trust Territory under Australian administration.

On 9 September 1975, the Parliament of Australia passed the Papua New Guinea Independence Act 1975. The Act set 16 September 1975 as date of independence and terminated all remaining sovereign and legislative powers of Australia over the territory. Bougainville was to become part of an independent Papua New Guinea. However, on 11 September 1975, in a failed bid for self-determination, Bougainville declared itself the Republic of the North Solomons. The republic failed to achieve any international recognition, and a settlement was reached in August 1976. Bougainville was then absorbed politically into Papua New Guinea with increased self-governance powers.

Between 1988 and 1998, the Bougainville Civil War claimed over 15,000 lives. Peace talks brokered by New Zealand began in 1997 and led to autonomy. A multinational Peace Monitoring Group (PMG) under Australian leadership was deployed. In 2001, a peace agreement was signed including promise of a referendum on independence from Papua New Guinea. This referendum was held between 23 November and 7 December 2019, with results being declared on 11 December. The referendum question was a choice between greater autonomy within Papua New Guinea, or full independence. Of the valid votes, 98.31% were in favour of full Independence. The vote is not binding; the Government of Papua New Guinea has the final say on the status of Bougainville.

Geography
Bougainville is the largest island in the Solomon Islands archipelago. It is part of the Solomon Islands rain forests ecoregion. Bagana in the north central part of Bougainville is conspicuously active, spewing out smoke that is visible for many kilometres. Earthquakes are frequent, but cause little damage.

Ecology 
Bougainville Island is primarily forested with a diverse tropical ecosystem. Copper mining on the island by a Rio Tinto-owned mining operation caused significant detriment to the immediate and downstream ecology from the destruction of forest and heavy metal-contaminated mine tailings, resulting in an uprising by the islanders to protect their land and native ecology. More recently, deforestation in order to feed the growing population has affected the flow of many rivers on the island. The United Nations Environmental Program has offered to facilitate the cleanup of the Rio Tinto-owned Panguna mine and explore reopening the mine with more stringent environmental standards.

Climate

Economy
Bougainville has one of the world's largest copper deposits, which has been under development since 1972, but was shut down in a popular revolution against the foreign-owned mining interests. Due to a seven-year blockade of the island by the Papua New Guinean Army during the Coconut Revolution, the island was cut off from the outside world. This pressure forced the islanders to develop self-sustaining systems from salvaged parts and foraged resources, including village-scale hydropower, coconut bio-diesel, diversified forest-garden farms, and neo-traditional herbal medicine. These innovations were a major focus of the documentary film The Coconut Revolution.

Demographics

Religion 
The majority of people on Bougainville are Christian, an estimated 70% being Roman Catholic and a substantial minority United Church of Papua New Guinea since 1968. Few non-natives remain, as most were evacuated following the civil wars.

Languages 
There are many indigenous languages in Bougainville Province, belonging to three language families.  The languages of the northern end of the island, and some scattered around the coast, belong to the Austronesian family. The languages of the north-central and southern lobes of Bougainville Island belong to the North and South Bougainville families.

The most widely spoken Austronesian language is Halia and its dialects, spoken in the island of Buka and the Selau peninsula of Northern Bougainville. Other Austronesian languages include Nehan, Petats, Solos, Saposa (Taiof), Hahon and Tinputz, all spoken in the northern quarter of Bougainville, Buka and surrounding islands. These languages are closely related. Bannoni and Torau are Austronesian languages not closely related to the former, which are spoken in the coastal areas of central and south Bougainville. On the nearby Takuu Atoll a Polynesian language is spoken, Takuu.

The Papuan languages are confined to the main island of Bougainville. These include Rotokas, a language with a very small inventory of phonemes, Eivo, Terei, Keriaka, Naasioi (Kieta), Nagovisi, Siwai (Motuna), Baitsi (sometimes considered a dialect of Siwai), Uisai and several others. These constitute two language families, North Bougainville and South Bougainville.

None of the languages are spoken by more than 20% of the population, and the larger languages such as Nasioi, Korokoro Motuna, Telei, and Halia are split into dialects that are not always mutually understandable. For general communication most Bougainvilleans use Tok Pisin as a lingua franca, and at least in the coastal areas Tok Pisin is often learned by children in a bilingual environment. English and Tok Pisin are the languages of official business and government.

Human rights
Cut off from the outside world for several years by a Papua New Guinean blockade during the civil war, the islanders suffered many deaths from a lack of medical resources.

A 2013 United Nations survey of 843 men found that 62% (530 respondents) of those have raped a woman or girl at least once, with 41% (217 respondents) of the men reported having raped a non-partner, whereas 14% (74 respondents) reported having committed gang rape. Additionally, the survey also found that 8% (67 respondents) of the men had raped other men or boys.

Popular culture
The Coconut Revolution, a documentary about the struggle of the indigenous population to save their island from environmental destruction and gain independence, was made in 1999.

An Evergreen Island (2000), a film by Australian documentary filmmakers Amanda King and Fabio Cavadini of Frontyard Films, showed the ingenuity with which the Bougainvillean people survived for almost a decade (1989-1997) without trade or contact with the outside world, because of a trade dispute.

Mr. Pip (2012) is a film by New Zealand director Andrew Adamson based on the book Mister Pip by Lloyd Jones.

Independence referendum 

In late November 2019 a non-binding referendum was held to decide whether Bougainville should be a sovereign state independent from Papua New Guinea. The result was overwhelmingly in favour of sovereignty for the island, with 98% of the votes supporting secession. The Papua New Guinea government and Bougainville have agreed that the region will attain full independence in 2027 pending approval of the PNG government.

See also 

 Battle of Empress Augusta Bay
 Bougainville campaign
 Bougainville Copper
 Bougainville Revolutionary Army
 Bougainvillea
 The Bougainville Photoplay Project
 Empress Augusta Bay
 Francis Ona
 List of birds of the Solomon Islands archipelago
 North Solomon Islands
 Solomon Archipelago

References

Bibliography
 
 
 Hobbs, J. (2017). Fundamentals of World Regional Geography (4th ed.). Boston, Massachusetts.

Further reading

 Robert Young Pelton, Hunter Hammer and Heaven, Journeys to Three Worlds Gone Mad. 

Islands of Papua New Guinea
Solomon Islands (archipelago)
.
1899 establishments in German New Guinea
1919 disestablishments in German New Guinea
1943 establishments in Australia
1975 disestablishments in Australia
1975 establishments in Papua New Guinea
Copper mines in Papua New Guinea